Iraqis are the second largest minority group living in Sweden, with 146,048 Iraqi-born people living in Sweden and 79,732 Swedes with at least one Iraqi-born parent. They are also one of the largest Asian communities in the country. The size of this group has doubled in the period of 2002 to 2009; the influx of Iraqi refugees increased dramatically from 2006 to 2009 as a result of the US-led invasion of Iraq.

Population
Iraq-born people are the third largest minority group living in Sweden, after the Sweden Finns (5.1%) and the Syrians (2.4%). They are also one of the largest Asian communities in Sweden.

Migration history
Iraqi immigrants to Sweden have come in four distinct waves of migration. In the first wave (1968–1978), around 8,000 Kurdish and Assyrian nationalists and Iraqi communists were escaping the Baathist regime. The second wave (1980–1988) of 10,000 people was mainly Kurds and Assyrians escaping the Al-Anfal Campaign and Iraqi men escaping forced conscription in the Iran–Iraq War. The third wave (1991–1999) was about 15,000 people, again mostly Kurdish and Assyrian people from Northern Iraq; most came with families. The largest numbers, almost 30,000 people, of Iraqis in Sweden today have migrated as a consequence of the Iraq War of 2003 to 2010; most are Sunni Arabs and Assyrian Christians.

Christian Iraqis, fearing persecution in their homeland, made up a large part of that influx after Iraq occupation in 2003. Sweden accepted more than half of all asylum applications from Iraqis in Europe. In 2006, over 9,000 Iraqis fled their country and came to Sweden seeking shelter, a fourfold increase over 2005. In 2007, Sweden attempted to throttle the influx of Iraqi refugees by tightening the rules for asylum seekers, but in 2008 there were again record numbers of Iraqi immigrants, close to 12,000. In 2009, the number of immigrants fell again slightly, to 8,400.

Iraqi-born persons in Sweden by year:

Refugee status and naturalization
In 2006 Sweden granted protection status to more Iraqis than in all other EU states combined.  In 2005 only 0.1 percent of Iraqis were recognised as refugees, but the total recognition rate including those granted complementary protection was a relatively high 24 per cent. In the year 2006 however, recognition rates leapt to a total of 91 per cent.

The Swedish Migration Board decided in early 2006 that all Iraqi asylum-seekers from Central and Southern Iraq whose claims had been rejected as part of the normal status determination process would nevertheless receive a permanent residence permit, allowing the majority of Iraqis in Sweden to begin the process of fully integrating into Swedish society with a secure legal status.

In the context of the generally low recognition rates for Iraqis in other EU states, Sweden's generosity led to a surge in the number of applications received from Iraqis. Figures increased from 2,330 in 2005 to 8,951 the following year, with a further 1,500 new arrivals per month in the first half of 2007. Most of these persons have joined the existing Iraqi community in Sweden in municipalities such as Malmö and Södertälje, with the scale of the influx to these areas forcing newcomers to live in very poor conditions. Speaking in June 2007, Södertälje's mayor Anders Lago described the situation as being close to breaking point, with the authorities barely able to provide basic services and many newcomers sharing apartments with up to fifteen people.

Notable people
 Aimar Sher, footballer
 Darin, singer
 Elaf Ali, journalist and author
 Peter Gwargis, footballer
 Mohanad Jeahze, footballer
 Kevin Yakob, footballer
 Bovar Karim, footballer
 Ahmed Yasin, footballer
 Mohamed Said, actor
 Salam Karam, journalist
 Modhir Ahmed, visual artist
 Abir Al-Sahlani, politician
 Hayv Kahraman, artist and painter

See also

 Demographics of Sweden
 Asian immigrants to Sweden
 Arabs in Sweden
 Islam in Sweden
 Immigration to Sweden
 Iraqi refugees
 Assyrians/Syriacs in Sweden
 Mandaeans in Sweden
 List of Iraqis
 Iraq–Sweden relations

References

External links
 Iraqi Swedish Chamber of Commerce (ISCC)
 Iraqi Swedish Business Centre (ISBC)

Arabs in Sweden
Ethnic groups in Sweden
 
Middle Eastern diaspora in Sweden
Muslim communities in Europe